Masego Ntshingane (born 14 November 1978) is a Botswana former footballer who played as a midfielder. He played for the Botswana national football team between 1997 and 2006. Besides Botswana, he has played in the United States.

References

External links
 

Association football midfielders
Botswana footballers
Botswana international footballers
1978 births
Living people
Auburn Tigers men's soccer players
Mogoditshane Fighters players